Black Hereford may be:

Black Hereford (breed), a black colour variety of Hereford cattle recognized as a breed, originally derived from crossbreeding with Angus cattle
Black Hereford (crossbreed), a cross of Hereford and Holstein-Friesian dairy cattle

See also
Black Baldy, another black-coloured variety of Hereford/Angus crossbreed